Myles Brundidge (born 1960 in Wisconsin Rapids, Wisconsin) is an American curler. He competed at the 1998 Winter Olympics in Nagano, where the American team placed 4th, and at the 2002 Winter Olympics in Salt Lake City, where they placed 7th. In 1999 he was named the United States Curling Association and United States Olympic Committee Male Athlete of the Year.

Teams 
1998 Winter Olympics

 Tim Somerville, Skip
 Mike Peplinski, Third
 Myles Brundidge, Second
John Gordon, Lead

2002 Winter Olympics, 1995 World Men's Championship, 1996 World Men's Championship

 Tim Somerville, Skip
 Mike Schneeberger, Third
 Myles Brundidge, Second
John Gordon, Lead

1999 World Men's Championship

 Tim Somerville, Skip
Donald Barcome Jr., Third
 Myles Brundidge, Second
John Gordon, Lead

References

External links 

1960 births
Living people
People from Wisconsin Rapids, Wisconsin
American male curlers
Olympic curlers of the United States
Curlers at the 1998 Winter Olympics
Curlers at the 2002 Winter Olympics
American curling champions